Corythophora is a genus of woody plant in the Lecythidaceae family first described as a genus in 1939. It is native to northeastern South America (French Guiana, Suriname, northern Brazil).

Species
 Corythophora alta R.Knuth - Pará, Amazonas
 Corythophora amapaensis Pires ex S.A.Mori & Prance - French Guiana, Amapá
 Corythophora labriculata (Eyma) S.A.Mori & Prance - Suriname
 Corythophora rimosa W.A.Rodrigues - French Guiana, Amazonas, Amapá, Suriname

References

Lecythidaceae
Flora of South America
Ericales genera
Taxonomy articles created by Polbot